is a public university, located in the city of Akita, Japan.

History
The Akita City School of Crafts was established in June 1952. It was renamed the Akita City School of Arts and Crafts in April 1975. The Akita Municipal Junior College of Arts and Crafts was chartered by the Japanese government as a two-year college in 1995. On April 1, 2013, a four-year college was also chartered by the Japanese government.

External links

References

Educational institutions established in 2013
Prestige International Aranmare Akita
Private universities and colleges in Japan
Universities and colleges in Akita Prefecture
2013 establishments in Japan
Art schools in Japan
Buildings and structures in Akita (city)
Arts organizations established in 2013